The Chinatown Mystery is a 1915 short silent mystery film directed by Reginald Barker and featuring Howard C. Hickman, Leona Hutton, Sessue Hayakawa and Tsuru Aoki in important roles.

References

External links 
 
 Chinatown Mystery Movie Cast

American silent short films
American black-and-white films
American mystery films
Films directed by Reginald Barker
1915 mystery films
1915 short films
1910s American films
Silent mystery films